Shalimar (Punjabi) is an administrative town (tehsil) in Lahore, Punjab, Pakistan. It forms one of the 10 municipalities of Lahore City District.

History 
Shalimar is one of the oldest neighbourhoods in Lahore, located along the historic Grand Trunk Road. Settlement of this area dates back to the 15th century during the Mughul Empire. The town is named after the Shalimar Gardens, built by Emperor Shah Jehan in 1640. The Mela Chiraghan festival used to take place at Shalimar Gardens, until President Ayub Khan ordered against it in 1958. Shalimar was officially declared a township in 1962 and become an administrative town (tehsil) of Lahore City District in 2001.

Neighbourhoods

Academic Institutions 
University of Engineering and Technology, Lahore

Healthcare 
Shalimar Hospital

See also
Lahore City District
Metropolitan Commission Lahore

References

Shalamar Zone